Gervase Gordon better known as, OKZharp is a South African music producer and DJ.

Early life and career
Alongside his previous partners in the UK-based trio, LV, he also helped produce the single "Boomslang" which featured rapper Okmalumkoolkat in 2010 and was released through Hyperdub.

For his own productions, he has frequently collaborated with performance artist and singer Manthe Ribane. In 2015, he released his debut EP, Dumella 113 featuring Manthe Ribane which was released through Hyperdub.

In early 2016, he released his second EP Gated with Samrai and in that same year, he released his third EP Tell Your Vision which featured Manthe Ribane and was released through Hyperdub. The EP was written and recorded in London over two weeks in January 2016.

In 2018, he release his first debut R&B-influenced album, Closer Apart, featuring singer Manthe Ribane and was released Hyperdub. The title of the album referenced their long-distance musical relationship, with Ribane being based in South Africa and OKZharp living in Britain. Explaining his album:
Most of the music came out of headphones moments in hotel rooms, planes and airports in the brief periods of time that we spent together, mainly on tour, in Paris and later Vienna.

In 2019, he collaborated with DJ Lag on the gqom EP, Steam Rooms. The pair had formulated plans to record the album while touring together and the resulting EP was named after the clubs of Durban gave rise to the gqom sound.

He has played on BBC Radio 6 Music's guest mix. He has headlined at Afropunk Festival and has also featured at music festivals and venues such as the Glastonbury Festival and the Africa Centre Summer Festival in United Kingdom.

Discography

Collaborative albums & EPs

References

External links
Okzharp on Discogs

South African musicians
South African DJs
Living people
Year of birth missing (living people)